Rinesh Rajesh Sharma (born 22 April 1993) is a Fijian entrepreneur, politician and member of the Parliament of Fiji. He is a member of the FijiFirst party.

Early career and education 
In 2018, Sharma graduated from Sri Venkateswara College of Engineering and Technology in India with a Bachelor of Computer Science and Engineering degree. He is originally from Lautoka. He then founded Smarts Fiji which specialises in hydroponics farming. That same year, he was able to secure a government-backed grant to begin automated hydroponics farms on a commercial scale in Fiji. 

In February 2020, Sharma was nominated for the 2020 Commonwealth Youth Awards. That same year, he received funding from the Bill & Melinda Gates Foundation to combat the impacts of the COVID-19 pandemic in Fiji.

Political career 
Sharma was one of the candidates announced by FijiFirst for the 2022 Fijian general election. He was elected to the Parliament of Fiji with 1,705 votes. At 29, he is the youngest to be serving as a member of parliament.

References 

1993 births
Living people
FijiFirst politicians
21st-century Fijian politicians
Members of the Parliament of Fiji
Fijian farmers
Fijian engineers
Politicians from Lautoka